The women's beach volleyball tournament at the 2018 Asian Games took place at the Jakabaring Beach Volley Arena, Palembang, Indonesia from 19 to 27 August 2018.

Schedule
All times are Western Indonesia Time (UTC+07:00)

Results
Legend
r — Retired

Preliminary round

Pool A

Pool B

Pool C

Pool D

Knockout round

Final standing

References

External links
Beach volleyball at the 2018 Asian Games

Women